Saeid Alihosseini (born 2 February 1988) is a former Iranian super heavyweight weightlifter. He failed two doping tests in 2006 and October 2009; the latter was originally a lifetime ban, but was reduced upon first appeal to 12 years; in 2011, the ban was reduced to eight years.

Weightlifting career

Doping ban
Saeid had failed two doping tests in 2006 and October 2009; the latter was originally a lifetime ban, but was reduced upon first appeal to 12 years. In 2011, after it was discovered that his coach (who had been banned himself) was doping his athletes without their knowledge, the ban was reduced to eight years.

World Championships
In 2017 he was eligible to return to international competition, and competed at the 2017 World Weightlifting Championships. He won bronze medals in the snatch and clean & jerk, and after his teammate Behdad Salimi had his final clean and jerk overturned by the jury Saeid won the silver medal.

In 2018 Saeid was originally going to compete at the 2018 World Weightlifting Championships, but an injury forced him to withdraw from the competition.

Retirement
In November 2019, Alihosseini announced his retirement from the sport after losing hope of competing in the 2020 Tokyo Olympic Games.

Major Results
Major results:

References

1988 births
People from Ardabil
Iranian male weightlifters
Living people
Iranian sportspeople in doping cases
Doping cases in weightlifting
World Weightlifting Championships medalists
Weightlifters at the 2018 Asian Games
Medalists at the 2018 Asian Games
Asian Games silver medalists for Iran
Asian Games medalists in weightlifting